State Route 88 (SR 88) is a  state highway completely within the city limits of Enterprise, in Coffee County. The western terminus of the highway is at an intersection with U.S. Route 84 north of town. The eastern terminus of the highway is at an intersection with SR 167/SR 192 in the southeastern part of town. SR 88 heads through downtown Enterprise before following Plaza Drive.

Route description

SR 88 begins at an intersection with US 84/SR 12/SR 192 on the northern edge of Enterprise. North of here, the road becomes a part of US 84/SR 12. From the Boll Weevil Circle, the beltway around Enterprise, SR 88 heads south on North Main Street, a three-lane road with a center left-turn lane. The highway travels through commercial areas a short distance to the west of a Wiregrass Central Railroad line. The highway eventually crosses the railroad line and turns southeast into more residential areas, reaching an intersection with SR 134. At this point, SR 134 joins SR 88 for a concurrency. Main Street heads into the commercial downtown of Enterprise, narrowing to two lanes. In the center of town, SR 27 joins SR 88/SR 134 on North Main Street and the road comes to the Boll Weevil Monument at the College Street intersection one block later, where the name changes to South Main Street. The highways leave the downtown, passing under the Wiregrass Central Railroad. SR 27 splits from the road by heading to the south, with SR 88/SR 134 turning southeast past more businesses, widening into a four-lane undivided road. The road curves to the east and becomes East Park Avenue. SR 88 splits from SR 134 by heading southeast on four-lane Plaza Drive, becoming a signed road at this point. The highway passes a mix of homes and businesses, passing Enterprise State Community College. SR 88 reaches its eastern terminus at the Boll Weevil Circle, intersecting SR 167/SR 192. At this point, the road continues as part of SR 167.

Major intersections

See also

References

088
Transportation in Coffee County, Alabama
Enterprise, Alabama